Evens Gravel (born 23 October 1970) is a Canadian fencer. He competed in the team sabre event at the 1992 and 1996 Summer Olympics.

References

External links
 

1970 births
Canadian male fencers
Fencers at the 1992 Summer Olympics
Fencers at the 1996 Summer Olympics
Living people
Olympic fencers of Canada
People from Chibougamau
Sportspeople from Quebec
Pan American Games medalists in fencing
Pan American Games gold medalists for Canada
Pan American Games bronze medalists for Canada
Fencers at the 1991 Pan American Games
Fencers at the 1999 Pan American Games
20th-century Canadian people